The Coti River is a river of Amazonas state in north-western Brazil, a tributary of the Curuquetê River.

The river flows through the Mapinguari National Park, a  conservation unit created in 2008.

See also
List of rivers of Amazonas

References

Brazilian Ministry of Transport

Rivers of Amazonas (Brazilian state)